Give It Up! is a rhythm platform game for iOS and Android. It was developed by Hungarian indie studio Invictus and released on December 18, 2014. In the game, the player is tasked with controlling a black blob, with simple touch controls. The player must avoid the various obstacles in the game by jumping over them to the beat of a song. A sequel for the game was also created, it was released on October 29, 2015.

Gameplay 
The game contains a total of nine different music tracks. To unlock each track, the player must complete the previous track without making a single mistake. Throughout each level, the background shows what percentage of the level the player has completed. If the player makes a mistake in the level before reaching the end at 100%, they are forced to start again.

The game contains only a single control, which is tapping the screen. The player has to time their taps, to ensure that they avoid the various obstacles (such as spikes) throughout the levels. The player can also fail a level by jumping too early and hitting a wall. The "safe" platforms that the player can land on during the levels are grey, but they turn green when stepped on. The obstacles are red.

Reception 
Give It Up! received mostly average reviews, with a mean metascore of 58. TouchArcade criticized the game for its repetition and lack of different songs in each level. However, the same review praised Give It Up! for its responsiveness and smooth running. Other reviews were unimpressed by the game for its difficulty and how frustrating it was. It was also criticized for becoming largely a memorization challenge.

The sequel generally received more positive reviews, with TouchArcade giving the game a 4.5/5.

References

External links 

2014 video games
Android (operating system) games
Mobile games
IOS games
Platform games
Music video games
Video games developed in Hungary